The Ford Modular engine is Ford Motor Company's overhead camshaft (OHC) V8 and V10 gasoline-powered small block engine family. Despite popular belief that the Modular engine family received its moniker from the sharing of engine parts across numerous Ford vehicle platforms, in reality, the Modular engine family was named as such by Ford Motor Company for the new "modular approach" to the setup of tooling and casting stations in the Windsor and Romeo engine manufacturing plants.

Implementing a "modular approach" allowed for significantly faster changeovers when switching from one engine platform to another among the Modular engine family. This also allowed for the existing engine plants, and their supporting offsite production facilities, to handle shorter production runs. Implementing shorter production runs without incurring large shutdown and retooling expenses helped to increase the versatility of those production stations that required tooling or machining setups specific to a certain vehicle platform.

The Modular engine family started with the 4.6L in 1990 for the 1991 model year. The Modular engines are used in various Ford, Lincoln, and Mercury vehicles. Modular engines used in Ford trucks were marketed under the Triton name from 1997–2010 while the InTech name was used for a time at Lincoln and Mercury for vehicles equipped with DOHC versions of the engines. The engines were first produced in the Ford Romeo Engine Plant, then additional capacity was added in Windsor, Ontario.

Origins
In the early 1980s, then-Ford Motor Company chief operating officer Donald Petersen challenged Ford's vice-president of design, Jack Telnack, and his staff to come up with new vehicle designs that they could take pride in. The result was an abandonment of the boxy styling that had dominated Ford products for years and the adoption of sleeker, more aerodynamic designs like that used for the highly successful Ford Taurus. In the second half of the 1980s, Petersen, now chief executive officer, sought to update Ford's decades-old V8 architectures, challenging Ford senior engineer Jim Clarke to do for Ford's V8s what Jack Telnack had done for Ford's vehicle design. The objective was to develop a new V8 engine that would surpass Ford's earlier V8s in every meaningful way, from power and efficiency to emissions performance and smoothness of operation.

Clarke and his engineers studied engine designs from major European and Japanese automakers and sought to develop a V8 that was technologically advanced and power-dense, yet also dependable with no major service required before 100,000 miles of use. This square configuration was chosen primarily for its positive noise, vibration and harshness characteristics. The engine would utilize features such as a chain-driven, single-overhead camshaft valvetrain with roller finger followers, a deep-skirt cast-iron block construction and cross-bolted main bearings, all benefitting long-term durability. In the interest of reducing overall engine weight, aluminum-alloy heads and pistons would be standard and all major engine accessories would be mounted directly to the block, resulting in a more complex block casting but eliminating the need for heavy mounting brackets. Tight construction tolerances were used in shaping the engine's cylinder bores with narrow piston rings fitted to the engine's pistons. This would serve to improve engine efficiency through reduced friction and reduce the engine's oil consumption, while also promoting cleaner emissions.

Perhaps the most significant aspect of the new engine's design was the number of variations of the engine that could be made to suit different needs. This resulted in the creation of an entire family of engines consisting not only of designs utilizing single- or dual-overhead camshaft configurations, different displacements and different block materials, but also different cylinder counts. In addition to the various eight-cylinder engines produced, ten-cylinder engines eventually entered production. Six-cylinder derivatives were also explored, though never built. With the wide array of engine configurations possible within this architecture, Ford developed a new, modular tooling system for producing different engines quickly and efficiently in the same factory. Referring to this method of production, the name Modular was given to the new engine family. Despite all the different engines that would be built over the years, one of the major unifying aspects present in all engines based on the Modular architecture, and required by the engine's tooling for production purposes, was a common bore spacing of 100 mm (3.937 in).

By 1987 Ford was fully committed to producing the new Modular V8, having invested $4 billion in the engine's design in addition to retooling the company's Romeo, Michigan tractor plant to build the engines. Three years later, in the third quarter of 1990, the first Modular engine, a 4.6L SOHC V8, would be used in the 1991 model year Lincoln Town Car. To the credit of Jim Clarke's engineering team, the new V8 engine in the Town Car compared favorably to its pushrod-based predecessor. In spite of having a smaller displacement, the 4.6L Modular V8 could generate more power than the Town Car's previous 5.0L V8 and could launch the car  1.5 seconds quicker, all while delivering better fuel efficiency. Accompanying these performance advantages, the engine was also  lighter than the older 5.0L V8.

Following the Modular V8's debut in the Town Car, engines using the Modular architecture would go on to replace older V8 designs in Ford products, eventually becoming Ford's chief gasoline V8 (and V10) architecture.

4.6 L 

The  displacement 90-degree V8 has been offered in 2-valve SOHC, 3-valve SOHC, and 4-valve DOHC versions. The engines were also offered with both aluminum and cast iron blocks, depending on application. Cylinder bore spacing measures , which is common to all members of the Modular engine family. All Modular V8s, except for the new 5.0 L Coyote, utilize the same firing order as the Ford 5.0 L HO and 351 CID V8s (1-3-7-2-6-5-4-8). The 4.6 L engines have been assembled at Romeo Engine Plant in Michigan, and at Windsor Engine Plant and Essex Engine Plant, both located in Windsor, Ontario.

The final 4.6 L engine was produced in May 2014. The engine was a 2-valve version and installed in a 2014 model year Ford E-Series van.

2-valve
The first production Modular engine was the 4.6 L 2-valve SOHC V8 introduced in the 1991 Lincoln Town Car.

The 4.6 L 2V has been built at both Romeo Engine Plant and Windsor Engine Plant, and the plants have different designs for cylinder heads (cam caps: interconnected cam "cages" vs. individual caps per cam journal), camshaft sprockets (bolt-on vs. press-on), valve covers (11 bolts vs. 13 bolts), crankshaft (6 bolts vs. 8 bolts) and main bearing caps (2 bolt fasteners with 2 jackscrews vs. 2 bolt fasteners with dowel pins).

Vehicles equipped with the 16-valve SOHC 4.6 L include the following:

3-valve

The 3-valve SOHC 4.6 L with variable camshaft timing (VCT) first appeared in the redesigned 2005 Ford Mustang.

The engines are equipped with an electronic Charge Motion Control Valve (CMCV) system that provides increased air velocity at low engine speeds for improved emissions and low-rpm torque. Cylinder block material varies between aluminum used in the 2005-10 Mustang GT and cast iron used in the truck applications.

The 3-valve SOHC 4.6 L engine was on the Ward's 10 Best Engines list for 2005–2008.

Vehicles equipped with the 24-valve SOHC VCT 4.6 L include the following:

4-valve

The 4-valve DOHC version of the Modular engine was introduced in the 1993 Lincoln Mark VIII as the 4.6 L Four-Cam V8. Lincoln marketed the engine under the name InTech after 1995.

The 1993–1998 4-valve engines featured cylinder heads with two intake ports per cylinder (split-port) and variable runner length intake manifolds with either vacuum or electrically activated intake manifold runner controls (IMRC) depending on application. The engine was revised for 1999 with new cylinder heads featuring tumble-style intake ports (one intake port feeding two intake valves), new camshaft profiles, and fixed runner-length intake manifolds. These changes resulted in more power, torque and a broader power-band when compared to the earlier 4-valve engines.

All 4.6 L 4-valve engines featured aluminum engine blocks with 6-bolt main bearing caps, the only exception being the 2003–2004 SVT Cobra which had a 4-bolt main cast iron block. The 1999 and earlier engines featured an aluminum block cast in Italy by Fiat subsidiary Teksid S.p.A. Since 1996, all of the 4.6 L 4-valve engines manufactured for use in the SVT Cobra have been hand-built by SVT technicians at Ford's Romeo, Michigan plant.

The 4-valve DOHC 4.6 L engine was on the Ward's 10 Best Engines list for 1996 and 1997.

Vehicles equipped with the 32-valve DOHC 4.6 L include the following:

5.0 L Coyote

The  Coyote V8, first produced in 2010 for the 2011 model year, was an evolutionary (rather than revolutionary) development of Ford's Modular V8. Ford engineers needed to design a V8, specifically for the Mustang GT, that would compete with the GM 6.2L LS3 used in the new Chevrolet Camaro, and the new Chrysler 6.4L Hemi ESF in the Charger, Challenger, and Grand Cherokee. Since this engine replaced the already popular 4.6L and 5.4L Modular Engines, this engine had to remain close to the same physical size of the outgoing 4.6L, and share other specifications with it such as bore spacing, deck height, bell housing bolt pattern, etc. in order for the engine to utilize existing Modular production line tooling (the source of the 'Modular' designation for the engine family). The result was the 5.0L Coyote, which produced roughly the same amount of power as its competitors, but with a much smaller displacement. To strengthen the block enough to handle increased output, webbing was extensively used as reinforcement in the casting, rather than increasing the thickness of the walls. The intake plenum was also situated low between the two cylinder banks to meet the height constraint, thus the alternator traditionally placed low and center was moved to the side of the engine. The engine also retains the 4.6 L's  connecting rod length, which produces a 1.62:1 rod to stroke ratio. The firing order has been changed from that shared by all previous Modular V8s (1-3-7-2-6-5-4-8) to that of the Ford Flathead V8 (1-5-4-8-6-3-7-2). Compression ratio is 11.0:1, and despite having port fuel injection (as opposed to direct injection) the engine can still be run on 87 octane gasoline.

The Coyote features all new 4 valve DOHC cylinder heads that have shifted the camshafts outboard, which allowed for a compact roller finger follower setup with remote hydraulic valve lash adjusters and improved (raised) intake port geometry. The result is an intake port that outflows the Ford GT intake port by 4 percent and the Yates D3 (NASCAR) intake port up to  lift, which is the maximum lift of the Coyote's intake cams. Engine redline is 7000 rpm.

The Coyote is Ford's first implementation of its cam-torque-actuated (CTA) Twin Independent Variable Cam Timing (Ti-VCT) in a V8 engine, which allows the powertrain control module (PCM) to advance and retard intake and exhaust cam timing independently of each other, providing improved power, fuel economy and reduced emissions. The engine is assembled in Ford's Essex Engine Plant in Windsor, Ontario, using existing Modular tooling.

2018 (Gen. 3) Updates 
Other changes include Gen. 3 specific camshafts, enlarged intake and exhaust valves, an increased compression ratio of 12.0:1, a revised intake manifold, and 7500 RPM redline in the Mustang.

Boss 302 (Road Runner) Variant
A higher performance variant of the Coyote, dubbed Road Runner internally by Ford, is produced under the Boss 302 moniker used for the resurrected Boss 302 Mustang for the 2012 model year. The Boss 302 receives CNC ported heads cast in 356 aluminum providing additional airflow and strength, and a higher lift exhaust camshaft profile is used. Valvetrain components were lightened as much as possible, including the use of sodium filled exhaust valves, while strengthened powdered metal rods and forged aluminum pistons were added. Piston-cooling jets were also deleted, which are standard in the 5.0 model. Exterior changes include a high-mount intake plenum (as opposed to the standard engine's low-mounted one) with shorter runners to improve high-rpm power. The Boss's redline is increased to 7500 rpm, but has been verified stable up to 8400.

F-150 variant
A torque-biased variant of the Coyote is produced as an alternative to the EcoBoost V6 in the F-150 pickup truck. The F-150 5.0L receives a lower compression ratio (10.5:1), intake camshafts with less duration, cast iron exhaust manifolds, and revised cylinder heads to improve cooling. The intake manifold changed only in color, and height. These changes promote low-end and mid-range power and torque. The engine retains the Coyote's forged steel crank and piston-cooling jets but benefits from the addition of an external engine oil cooler similar to the Boss 302's. When the 2015 F-150 was revealed, Ford improved the induction system to pull air from above the grille under the hood (aka Ram Air Effect) as opposed to the fender intake inlet that had been used for all previous Ford Modular Engines.

For 2018, numerous revisions were made to the 5.0. Most notably, the adoption of a port and direct fuel injection system, as well as spray-on bore liner, eliminating the need for conventional cast iron cylinder bore liners (changes shared with the 2018 Mustang), and compression ratio is increased to 12.0:1.

Miami variant
The Miami was a supercharged variant designed by FPV (a joint -venture by Ford Australia and Prodrive) while the Coyote was still in development. Pre-production engines were shipped to Australia, where they were fitted with Australian-developed superchargers. The blocks and crank were common with the US Coyote engine but the sump, rods, pistons, intake manifold, supercharger, exhaust manifolds, wiring loom and engine control unit were designed and manufactured in Australia. The US Coyote engine had VVT on all 4 cams but the Australian ECU only had enough outputs to control 2 cams, so only the intake cams have VVT. The supercharger uses Eaton rotors in a housing designed by Australian company Harrop Engineering – the same company that provides superchargers to Roush Performance.

Later versions made ,  and ultimately  (with the addition of an intercooler).

Applications
The Miami variant was sold in the Australian Ford Falcon-based FPV GT range and the FGX XR8.
The  version was sold in the Falcon FPV Holy Grail.

The Coyote made Ward's 10 Best Engines list for 2011, 2012, and 2018.

The Coyote is available as a crate motor from Ford Racing Performance Parts (FRPP) complete with alternator, manifold, and wiring harness in standard  configuration. The Boss 302 is also available from FRPP for a premium over the standard 5.0L.

The engine is gradually replacing the 4.6L and 5.4L Modular V8 units in all Ford vehicles. This is the first time that Ford has used the "5.0" designation since the pushrod 5.0 was discontinued and replaced by the 4.6L Modular unit in the mid-90s.

Vehicles equipped with the 32-valve DOHC Ti-VCT 5.0 L include the following:

5.2 L

Voodoo

The  "Voodoo" is a development of the Coyote engine. The engine was developed specifically for the Shelby GT350 version of the sixth generation Mustang. In 2016, the engine received a Ward's 10 Best Engines award. Like other modern Ford Performance Mustang engines, the Voodoo is hand-built at Ford's Romeo Plant on the Niche Line.

Unlike the Coyote and previous Modular V8s, the Voodoo features a flat plane crankshaft. During development, Ford purchased a Ferrari California, the only other front-engine flat-plane crank V8 car in production at the time, as a benchmark. The Voodoo features a unique Up-Down-Up-Down crank pin configuration, as opposed to the typical Up-Down-Down-Up in inline-4s and other flat-plane V8s. Due to the unique crankpin configuration, the back-to-front firing order of 1-5-4-8-3-7-2-6, is also unique to the Voodoo. This engine was the biggest production flat plane crank V8 by displacement until General Motors introduced the LT6.

The GT350R variant of the engine received a number of valvetrain enhancements, including the timing chains, lash adjusters, and VCT mechanisms.

Vehicles equipped with the 32-valve DOHC 5.2 L include the following:

Aluminator
The "Aluminator" is another variant of the Coyote engine utilizing the 5.2 L cylinder block from the GT350. The Aluminator is differentiated from the Voodoo engine by a Cobra Jet intake manifold and throttle body, CNC ported cylinder heads, and a cross-plane crankshaft.

This engine is sold as a Ford Performance Parts crate engine without a wiring harness, a flywheel, or headers.

Predator
The "Predator" is a  variant of the "Coyote" engine utilizing a cross-plane crank and a supercharger, which is installed in the Mustang Shelby GT500 starting in 2020 and the F-150 Raptor R starting in late 2022. This was also the last engine to be produced at the DAP Niche line.

5.4 L
The  V8 is a member of the Modular engine family first introduced in the 1997 F-series pick-ups, in place of the 5.8L 351W. A  connecting rod length is used to achieve a 1.60:1 rod to stroke ratio. The 5.4 L 2V was built at the Windsor Engine Plant, while the 5.4 L 3V moved production to the Essex Engine Plant beginning in 2003, then back to Windsor Engine Plant in 2009. The SVT 5.4 L 4-valve engines are built at Romeo Engine Plant, hand assembled on the niche line.

2-valve

Introduced in 1997, the SOHC 2-valve 5.4 L has a cast iron engine block and aluminum cylinder heads. The 5.4 L features multi-port fuel injection, roller finger followers, fracture-split powder metal connecting rods, and in some applications a forged steel crankshaft.

The 2-valve SOHC 5.4 L engine was on the Ward's 10 Best Engines list for 1997–1998 and 2000–2002.

Vehicles equipped with the 16-valve SOHC 5.4 L include the following:

3-valve
In 2002, Ford introduced a new 3-valve SOHC cylinder head with variable camshaft timing (VCT), improving power and torque over the previous 2-valve SOHC version. The 3-valve cylinder head was first used on the 2002 Ford Fairmont 5.4 L Barra 220 engine in Australia manufactured in Windsor, Ontario, Canada. The 3-valve 5.4 L was introduced to the North American market in the redesigned 2004 Ford F-150.

Vehicles equipped with the 24-valve SOHC VCT 5.4 L include the following:

4-valve

In 1999, Ford introduced the DOHC 4-valve 5.4 L in the Lincoln Navigator under the InTech moniker, making it the second engine to use this name. Ford later used versions of the DOHC 4-valve 5.4 L in the 2000 Ford Mustang SVT Cobra R, the Ford GT supercar, and the Ford Shelby GT500. The DOHC 4-valve 5.4 L was also used in the Ford Falcon line in Australia under the Boss moniker until 2010, when it was replaced by a locally developed, supercharged version of the 5.0 litre Modular V8.

The SVT Cobra R version of the 5.4 L 4-valve V8 had several key differences from its Lincoln counterpart. While the iron block and forged steel crankshaft were sourced directly from the InTech 5.4 L, the Cobra R powerplant benefited from new, high-flow cylinder heads that were designed with features developed for Ford's "Rough Rider" off-road racing program, application specific camshafts with higher lift and more duration than other 4-valve Modular cams, forged I-beam connecting rods sourced from Carillo, forged pistons that provided a 9.6:1 compression ratio in conjunction with the 52 cc combustion chambers, and a unique high-flow "cross-ram" style aluminum intake manifold.

It is an all-aluminum alloy, dry-sump DOHC 4 valves per cylinder with an Eaton 2300 Lysholm screw-type supercharger and showcases numerous technological features, such as dual fuel injectors per cylinder and oil squirters for the piston skirts, not found in other Ford Modular engines of the time.

The Shelby GT500 uses a 4-valve DOHC 5.4 L with an Eaton M122H Roots type supercharger and air-to-liquid intercooler. The GT500 5.4 L shares its high-flow cylinder head castings with the Ford GT, with only minor machining differences, and shares camshafts with the 2003–2004 Ford Mustang SVT Cobra; which have less lift and duration than the Ford GT camshafts. The 2007–2010 GT500 engine used an iron engine block, while the 2011 GT500 5.4 L receives a new aluminum engine block, with Ford's first production application of their patented Plasma Transferred Wire Arc (PTWA) cylinder coating, eliminating the need for pressed in cylinder liners. The PTWA spray apparatus was co-developed by Ford and Flame-Spray Industries of Long Island, New York, for which they received the 2009 IPO National Inventors of the Year Award. The 2011 GT500 engine weighs  less than the previous iron-block version, thanks in part to the lack of cast iron cylinder liners. All of the 5.4 L 4-valve engines destined for use in SVT vehicles, such as the Ford GT and Shelby GT500, have been hand-built by technicians at Ford's Romeo, Michigan plant.

Vehicles equipped with the 32-valve DOHC 5.4 L include the following:

5.8 L Trinity
The 5.8 is formally known as the Trinity Engine or 5.8-liter V8 engine, which benefits from cylinder heads with improved coolant flow, Ford GT camshafts, piston-cooling oil jets similar to those found on the 5.0 Coyote, new 5-layer MLS head gaskets, an over-rev function that increases the red line to 7000 rpm for up to 8 seconds (from 6250 rpm), and a compression ratio increased to 9.0:1 from 8.5:1. Trinity has  intake valves and  exhaust valves.

6.8 L V10
The  SOHC V10 is another variation of the Modular family created for use in large trucks. Both 2-valve and 3-valve versions have been produced. The 6.8 L uses a split-pin crank with 72° firing intervals and a balance shaft gear driven by the left camshaft to quell vibrations inherent to a 90° bank angle V10 engine. The engine's firing order is 1-6-5-10-2-7-3-8-4-9. The 2-valve version was first introduced in 1997, with a 3-valve non-VCT (the use of VCT was precluded by the presence of the balance shaft, as the shaft needed to remain in phase with the crankshaft) version to following in 2005.

Vehicles equipped with the 6.8 L V10 Modular engine include the following:

2-valve

3-valve

Ford of Australia

Ford Australia used 5.4 L Modular V8s in the Ford Falcon and previously on the Ford Fairlane sedan model ranges, as well as in its high performance Ford Performance Vehicles (FPV) division models, until mid-2010, when they were replaced by the 5.0L. The DOHC 5.4 L V8s are named Boss by Ford Australia. The 3 valve SOHC V8s in non-FPV vehicles are named "Barra" by Ford Australia.

Ford of Australia 4-valve DOHC 5.4 L V8 engines include:

5.0 L and 5.3 L Cammer

In 2005, Ford Racing Performance Parts introduced a  V8 crate engine for use in motor racing and home-made performance cars, officially called M-6007-T50EA, but more widely known as "Cammer". Since then, other higher performance variations of the Cammer have been introduced for KONI Sports Car Challenge and GT4 European Cup. The Cammer achieves its larger  bore by resleeving the 4.6 L aluminum block.

The T50 Cammer crate engine, the least expensive and most street oriented version, uses derivatives of the cylinder heads, variable runner-length magnesium intake manifold, and camshafts first used in the 2000 FR500 Mustang concept car. These parts are unique to the T50 Cammer crate engine and are not found in any other production Modular applications. The T50 has an 11.0:1 compression ratio and exceeds  with the proper exhaust manifolds.

The Cammer that has seen success in Grand Am Cup powering the Mustang FR500C is officially called M-6007-R50 and features a unique dual plenum, fixed runner-length magnesium intake manifold, Ford GT aluminum cylinder heads, unique camshafts of undisclosed specifications, and an 11.0:1 compression ratio. The R50 Cammer produces over  without restrictor plates. Upon introduction the R50 Cammer-powered Mustang FR500C proved to be dominant in Grand-Am Cup, having achieved five victories and podium appearances in nearly every race in the GS class during the 2005 season, giving David Empringham the championship title with the Multimatic Motorsports team, and Ford the manufacturer's title.

Robert Yates publicly expressed interest in using a similar 5.0 L 4-valve DOHC Modular V8 to compete in the NASCAR Winston Cup Series. Roush-Yates supplies a naturally aspirated  5.0 L Cammer for use in the Mustang FR500GT3 and Matech-Ford GT3 which participate in the FIA GT3 European Championship, and a naturally aspirated  5.3 L Cammer for use in the 2010 Matech-Ford GT1 that competes in FIA GT1 World Championship. The  Cammer's extra displacement is achieved via a  stroke.

World records

World's fastest production car

On February 28, 2005, the Koenigsegg CCR used a modified, Rotrex supercharged Ford Modular 4-valve DOHC 4.6L V8, which produced 806 hp (601 kW), to achieve a top speed of 241 mph (388 km/h).  The bore was achieved using Darton M.I.D. Sleeves. This certified top speed was recorded on February 28, 2005, in Nardo, Italy, and broke the McLaren F1's world record for fastest production car. The accomplishment was recognized by Guinness World Records in 2005, who gave the Koenigsegg CCR the official title of "World's Fastest Production Car." The Koenigsegg record was broken several months later by the Bugatti Veyron. This engine is the basis for Koenigsegg's twin-supercharged flexible fuel V8 seen in the CCX.

1/8 Mile & 1/4 Mile Drag Race World Records

1/8 Mile

This beat the previous  mile record, and made MMR’s record the first within the 3.8 seconds zone, and first to break the 200 mph mark in the 1/8 mile. The elapsed time and mph record were recorded at Bradenton Motorsports Park located in Bradenton, Florida, during an event sanctioned by the National Muscle Car Association (NMCA). The accomplishment was recognized by sanctioning bodies, such as the National Muscle Car Association (NMCA) and the National Mustang Racers Association (NMRA), granting it the official title of the "Fastest  Mile Modular / Coyote-Powered Vehicle in the World." On March 10, 2019, MMR announced that they had topped their previously-held record from 2018. The team’s new records were 3.817 seconds at 204.17 mph (328.58 km/h). The record was accomplished with MMR’s GenX 351 cubic inch Coyote-based engine platform, that featured a "new billet manifold" and other various engine updates.

1/4 Mile

The record was accomplished with a Coyote-based engine which featured factory Ford cylinder head castings, valves, lifters, and followers sitting atop a billet reproduction of the factory architecture Coyote cylinder block. The specifics of the engine are described by Luton as being a "351 cubic-inch billet MMR block that has a Bryant crankshaft, BME rods, and MMR pistons that are manufactured by Manley," in addition to "cylinder heads [that] are a factory cast head from Ford… that work with the twin 94mm turbos from Garrett." The elapsed time and mph records were recorded at the Las Vegas Motor Speedway, during a qualifying race hosted by Street Car Super Nationals (SCSN).

Intake manifold defect
Starting in 1996, Ford began installing a DuPont Zytel nylon-composite intake manifold onto the 2-valve SOHC engines. Plaintiffs in class action lawsuits alleged that the coolant crossover passage of these intake manifolds may crack, resulting in coolant leakage. A US class-action suit was filed on behalf of owners, resulting in a settlement announced on December 17, 2005.

Starting with the 2002 model year, and implemented halfway through the 2001 lineup, Ford began using a revised DuPont Zytel nylon-composite intake manifold with an aluminum front coolant crossover that corrected the issue. Replacement intakes were also made available for 1996–2001 engines. To be eligible for reimbursement, owners needed to contact a Ford, Lincoln or Mercury dealer within 90 days of December 16, 2005. Further, Ford offered an extended warranty for this part, for seven years from the start date (which means the initial vehicle sale date) without a mileage limitation.

The following vehicles were included in this class-action suit settlement:
 Mercury Grand Marquis, 1996–2001
 Lincoln Town Car, 1996–2001
 Ford Crown Victoria, 1996–2001
 Mercury Cougar, 1996–1997
 Ford Thunderbird, 1996–1997
 Ford Mustang, June 24, 1997 – 2001 (some vehicles)
 Ford Explorer, early 2002

Spark plug issues
2-valve 4.6 L, 5.4 L, and 6.8 L engines found in many 1997–2008 Ford, Lincoln, and Mercury vehicles may have aluminum cylinder heads with threads for spark plugs that are stripped, missing, or otherwise insufficiently bored out.  Ford acknowledges this issue in Technical Service Bulletin 07-21-2 as well as earlier TSBs. Ford's TSB does not state that this issue is caused by owner neglect.  Ford's only authorized repair procedure for out-of-warranty vehicles is to use the LOCK-N-STITCH aluminum insert and tool kit. For vehicles under the New Vehicle Limited Warranty, Ford will only cover the replacement of the entire cylinder head; however, the Ford recommended spark plug service interval extends beyond the duration of the New Vehicle Limited Warranty.

3-valve 5.4 L and 6.8 L engines built before 10/9/07 and 3-valve 4.6 Ls built before 11/30/07 found in many 2004–2008 Ford, Lincoln, and Mercury vehicles have an issue with difficult-to-remove spark plugs, which can cause part of the spark plug to become seized in the cylinder head. The source of the problem is a unique plug design that uses a 2-piece shell, which often separates, leaving the lower portion of the spark plug stuck deep in the engine's cylinder head.  The 2-piece OE spark plug design is intrinsically flawed, thus making it susceptible to this problem. Ford acknowledges this issue in TSB 08-7-6 as well as earlier TSBs. Ford's TSB does not state that this issue is caused by owner neglect. The TSB provides a special procedure for spark plug removal on these engines. For situations in which the spark plug has partially broken off in the cylinder head, Ford distributes multiple special tools for removing the seized portion of the plug. Their TSB explains the multiple procedures required for handling the different cases/situations that occur when parts of plugs are seized in these engines. This repair is covered for vehicles under warranty; however, the Ford recommended spark plug service interval extends beyond the duration of the New Vehicle Limited Warranty.

See also
 List of Ford engines
 List of Ford factories

References

Modular
Goods manufactured in Canada
Motor vehicles manufactured in the United States
V8 engines
V10 engines
Gasoline engines by model